Home for Christmas is the first Christmas album and second studio album by American boy band NSYNC. The album was released, exclusively in the United States, on November 10, 1998, following the success of their debut album. On October 27, 1999, Home for Christmas was certified Double Platinum by the RIAA for shipment of two million copies in the United States. Home for Christmas was released on September 30, 2002 in the United Kingdom as The Meaning of Christmas on Ariola Express with an altered track listing. 

"Merry Christmas, Happy Holidays" was released as a single in the United States, and in Germany as well, due to its inclusion on the group's German seasonal album, The Winter Album. As of December 2014, Home for Christmas has sold 2.8 million copies in the United States, making it the fifteenth best-selling Christmas/holiday album in the U.S. since Nielsen SoundScan started tracking music sales in 1991.

Critical reception 
During its time of release in 1998, Home for Christmas was met with lukewarm to negative reviews from critics who derided the song lyrics as “sentimental-sounding non sequiturs” and contended the group did not have the same charisma of fellow pop groups like the Backstreet Boys or the Spice Girls. At Rate Your Music, a website where users submit reviews, Home for Christmas was given a very low rating: 1.43 out of 5. However, critics also praised the album for having eleven original tracks, as well as for its “slickly produced adult contemporary ballads and lite dance-pop”. 

In the years since, the album has been commended for the strength of its five-part harmonies, displayed in songs like the group’s a capella of “O Holy Night.” It is also known as a rare NSYNC album that gives Chris Kirkpatrick, Joey Fatone, and Lance Bass vocal opportunities to shine.

Track listing
Most of the lead vocals are provided by Justin Timberlake and JC Chasez. 
"Under My Tree", "I Guess It's Christmas Time" has lead vocals provided by Chris Kirkpatrick
"All I Want Is You This Christmas", "It's Christmas" has lead vocals provided by Kirkpatrick and Joey Fatone
"The Only Gift" has lead vocals provided by Kirkpatrick, Fatone and Lance Bass

Notes
 signifies a vocal co-producer

Personnel
Credits adapted from album’s liner notes.

NSYNC
 Lance Bass – backing vocals
 JC Chasez – lead vocals
 Joey Fatone – backing vocals
 Chris Kirkpatrick – backing vocals
 Justin Timberlake – lead vocals

Additional personnel

 Troy Antunes — bass (track 7)
 Lou Appel — drums and percussion (track 1)
 Joey Argero — bass (tracks 5, 6)
 Alan "Double A" Armitage — mixing assistant (tracks 2-9, 12-14)
 Billy Ashbaugh — drums (track 7)
 Adam Barber — engineer (tracks 2, 4, 7, 9, 11-14)
 Johann Bast — strings (track 12)
 Tony Battaglia — guitars (track 7)
 David Bjella — strings (track 12)
 Joanie Bjella — strings (track 12)
 Scott Bliege — horns (track 6)
 Gary Carolla — producer (tracks 5, 6, 8, 10), keyboards and drums (5, 6, 8), arranger (5, 8), vocal arranger (10)
 Deborah Cole — additional vocals (track 1)
 Tom Coyne — mastering
 Frank Delour — drums and percussion (track 1)
 Rob Dorsey — drums and percussion (track 1)
 Lisa Ferrigno — strings (track 12)
 Keith Fluitt — additional vocals (track 1)
 Andricka Hall — additional vocals (track 1)
 Lawrence Hamilton — additional vocals (track 1)
 Matt Harris — assistant engineer (tracks 2-5, 7, 9, 11-14)
 Al Henberger — engineer (track 3)
 Ben Holt — assistant engineer (track 1)
 Manfred Honetschläger — strings arranger and conductor (track 10)
 John James — additional vocals (track 1)
 Stephanie James — additional vocals (track 1)
 Jürgen Kaiser — strings engineer (track 10)
 Mark Kiczula — assistant engineer (tracks 1, 5)
 Jim Kimball — engineer (track 11)
 Steve MacAuley — engineer (track 8)
 Danny Madden — vocal co-producer (track 1)
 Pat McMakin — mixing (track 11)
 Ann Mincieli — assistant engineer (track 1)
 Frank Motnik — assistant strings engineer (track 10)
 John Poppo — producer, arranger, engineer, and mixing (track 1)
 Jim Porreca — engineer (tracks 5, 6), assistant engineer (5)
 Jason Rea — assistant engineer (track 1)
 Giles Reaves — assistant engineer (track 11)
 Mia S. Rebel — additional vocals (track 1)
 Veit Renn — producer (tracks 2, 4, 7, 9, 12-14), guitar (4), strings arranger and conductor (12)
 Mike Rew — assistant engineer (track 1)
 Nicki Richards — additional vocals (track 1)
 Peter Ries — producer, engineer, mixing, keyboards, and programming (track 10)
 Evan Rogers — producer (track 3)
 Don Rogozinski — horns (track 6)
 Jennie Rudberg — strings (track 12)
 Peter "Ski" Schwartz — keyboard arrangements, string arrangements, and additional vocal arrangements (track 1)
 Mark Silverman — assistant engineer (tracks 2-4, 7, 9, 11-14)
 Andre Smith — additional vocals (track 1)
 Joe Smith — mixing (tracks 2-9, 12-14)
 Brian Snapp — saxophone (track 7)
 Carl Sturken — producer (track 3)
 Mike Tucker — engineer (tracks 3, 5, 6, 8, 10), additional vocal engineering (1)
 Voices of Praise — additional choir vocals (track 4)
 Rex Wertz — horns (track 6)
 Robin Wiley — producer and arranger (track 11)

Charts

Weekly charts

Year-end charts

Certifications and sales

References

NSYNC albums
1998 Christmas albums
2002 Christmas albums
Christmas albums by American artists
Pop Christmas albums
RCA Records Christmas albums